Francess Lin Lantz (August 27, 1952 – November 22, 2004) was an American children's librarian turned fiction writer. For more than two decades Lantz wrote more than 30 books, including several juvenile bestsellers. She was selected for the American Library Association Best Books for Young Adults for her 1997 romance, Someone to Love. Stepsister from Planet Weird (Random House, 1996) was made into a Disney Channel television movie in 2000.

Early years
Born in Trenton, New Jersey, Lantz was raised in Bucks County, Pennsylvania. She initially aspired to become a rock musician and composer. She graduated in 1974 from Dickinson College (in Pennsylvania) and from Simmons College (in Boston) in 1975, where she earned a master's degree in library sciences.

Death
She died in Santa Barbara, California in 2004 following a five years long battle with ovarian cancer; she was 52 years old.

Publications
Lantz authored more than 30 books and articles including:
 Woodstock Magic (Avon, 1986) 
 Fade Far Away (HarperCollins, 1998)  
 Stepsister from Planet Weird (Random House, 1996)  
 You're the One series
 Luna Bay surfer girl series

References

External links
Interview with Cynthia Leitich Smith re Lantz
"Bookrags" website

1952 births
2004 deaths
20th-century American novelists
American librarians
American women librarians
American children's writers
American women novelists
Deaths from cancer in California
Deaths from ovarian cancer
Dickinson College alumni
People from Bucks County, Pennsylvania
Writers from Santa Barbara, California
Writers from Trenton, New Jersey
Simmons University alumni
American women children's writers
20th-century American women writers
Novelists from Pennsylvania
Novelists from New Jersey
21st-century American women